Tarbes Cathedral is a Roman Catholic church located in the town of Tarbes, Hautes-Pyrénées, France. The cathedral is a national monument and is the seat of the Bishop of Tarbes et Lourdes.

History 
Tarbes Cathedral was established during the 12th century. Of the original building there remain two apses of the choir. A first extension was made in the 14th century by the addition of a Gothic nave, which until the 18th century was co-extensive with the outer span. The cathedral resembles a fortress and was built with round pebbles from the river Adour which have also been used for the construction of many houses in Tarbes. It can accommodate up to 600 people.

A large Baroque canopy in marble from the 18th century covers the main altar. Napoleon described Tarbes as "a street without a city, a bridge without a river, an altar without a church", with reference to the immense canopy.

The cathedral also includes a chapel of the Blessed Virgin in which visitors can read the testament of Louis XVI engraved on a black marble wall three meters high. Another feature is the treasure house containing ornaments, chasubles, bishops' crosiers and so forth. Saint Vincent de Paul was ordained as a deacon here in 1598.

External links

Location of the cathedral
Pelerin
Tarbes Cathedral at The Planet's Cathedrals
Tarbes Cathedral at Structurae

Churches in Hautes-Pyrénées
Roman Catholic cathedrals in France